Glynn is a village and a townland in County Antrim, Northern Ireland.

Glynn may also refer to one of the following:

Places
Glynn, Louisiana, an unincorporated community in the United States  
Glynn County, Georgia, United States
Glynn, U.S. Virgin Islands
Glynn railway station, serving Glynn in County Antrim, Northern Ireland
Glynn, Cornwall

Other uses
Glynn (surname)
Glynn Davis (born 1991), American baseball player
Glynn Harrison (born 1954), American football player
Glynn Academy, high school in Brunswick, Georgia, United States
Glynn Motorsports, racing team
Glynn, a fictional vertical boiler locomotive from Thomas & Friends

See also
Glynne (disambiguation)
Glyn (disambiguation)